The Lipótváros Synagogue was a planned but never realized monumental Budapest synagogue, which would have been built at the beginning of the 20th century and would have been a faithful reflection of the growing and enriching Jewry of Budapest with a capacity of 3,800 people. In the end, the building was not completed due to financial difficulties, its existence is only told by contemporary blueprints and newspaper articles.

History 
As a result of emancipation, the Jews of Hungary were granted a high degree of freedom in the second half of the 19th century. The number of Jews began to increase significantly, and it also played an increasingly important role in the cultural life of Budapest. Although several synagogues were built in Budapest during the 19th century, including the large Dohány Street Synagogue, they could no longer perform the functions necessary for the belief in Jewishness in Budapest, and were not at all prominent, and most were surrounded by other buildings. Lipótváros Jewry at that time was 12,000 people, the neighboring VI. and VII. and the district has 72,000 people. In 1893, the Jewish community of Pest made a request to the leadership of the capital:

“When the community wishes to fill a generally felt gap in its institutions of worship, it must be borne in mind that the church it is to build must not only be able to accommodate as many Jewish believers as possible on a permanent basis, but also to the capital and the capital. be a monumental building worthy of its dignity.”

The capital of the church to be built designated the plot surrounded by Szalay, Szemere, Markó and Koháry (today Ignác Nagy) streets and gave it to the community free of charge. An invitation to tender was issued on 20 February 1898, with the proviso that:
 the building must be free standing
 it must be able to accommodate 3600 people (compared to 1492 men and 1472 women in the Dohány Street Synagogue, for a total of 2964 seats.) 
 the maximum cost of its preparation is HUF 1,000,000.

The call eventually received 23 applications, which were judged in less than a month by a panel chaired by Zsigmond Kohner, president of the community, which also included renowned architects of the time. Some of these are:

 Plan by Foerk Ernő and Schömer Ferenc
 Plan by Bálint Zoltán and Jámbor Lajos
 Plan by Lajta Béla
 Plan by Schikedanz Albert and Herzog Fülöp
 Plan by Márkus Géza
 Plan by Vágó József, Vágó László and Scheer Izidor
 Plan by Scheer Izidor and Pollák Manó
 Plan by Kármán Aladár és Ullmann Gyula
 Plan by Henri Evers

The first place was won by the plans of Ernő Foerk and Ferenc Schömer. The building would probably have been the largest synagogue in the world, as the Emánu-Él Synagogue in New York, even larger than the Dohány Street Synagogue, seats only “only” 2,500 people and is 103 feet (or about 31 meters) high. While Foerk's plan estimated a capacity of 3,800, and a height of 70 meters. (It is true that it would still have been lower at the nearby 96-meter high St. Stephen's Basilica and the also 96-meter [6]-high Hungarian Parliament Building - however, it would have been barely lower than the Rózsák tér church [76 meters] or the Matthias Church [78 meters], and would have been higher than the 67-meter-high Bakács Square Church.)

However, it was a serious problem that the plans far exceeded those set in terms of construction costs (eg the dome of the winning entry itself was designed for HUF 6,000,000.) Foerk and Schömer subsequently submitted new plans, but did not reach the appropriate level. squeeze costs. After lengthy planning in 1907, the community dr. Fülöp Weinmann (1839–1911), a court councilor and a new president of the community, rejected further plans and replaced the plot with another plot next to the Dohány Street Synagogue. The Temple of the Heroes was later built here. The Lipót synagogue could not be built.

Sources 
 https://varoskepp.blog.hu/2008/11/13/a_lipotvarosi_zsinagoga
 https://24.hu/kultura/2015/09/15/ilyen-is-lehetett-volna-budapest-meg-nem-valosult-epulettervek-a-xx-szazadbol/
 http://lajtaarchiv.hu/muvek/a-lipotvarosi-zsinagoga-palyaterve-1899-v-marko-utca/
 https://zsido.com/megazsinagoga-helyett-berhazbeepites-a-lipotvarosi-zsinagogak-tortenete-1-resz/
 https://zsido.com/megazsinagoga-helyett-berhazbeepites-a-lipotvarosi-zsinagogak-tortenete-2-resz/
 https://zsido.com/megazsinagoga-helyett-berhazbeepites-a-lipotvarosi-zsinagogak-tortenete-3-resz/
 https://hvg.hu/itthon/20070327_zsinagoga_zsido_hitkozseg_kossuthter
 https://www.breuerpress.com/2013/04/01/europa-legnagyobb-meg-nem-epult-zsinagogaja/
 http://www.dohany-zsinagoga.hu/?page_id=14

Synagogues in Budapest